The Chu XP-0, also known as the Chu (AFAMF) XP-0, was a Chinese fighter prototype in the Second World War.

Development
Designed by the Chief of the Air Force Technical Bureau, Major General Chu Chia-Jen, in 1941, the XP-0 was a single-seat fighter monoplane, the single prototype of which was produced by AFAMF in 1943. Based largely on the Curtiss Hawk 75, it was of mixed construction with wooden three-spar wings, welded steel tube fuselage and plywood skinning. It could carry up to four 20 mm cannons underwing, and had capacity to carry bombs via a centreline bomb rack, allowing it to function as a dive bomber.

Operational history
It was anticipated that the XP-0 would be produced in series at AFAMF No. 1 factory at Kunming, however the prototype was flown for the first time in 1943, at Yangling. After circling the airfield, the XP-0 landed too fast, ground-looped and was written off. In the meantime, the American entry into World War II meant that American fighters were available to the Chinese, removing the need for China to manufacture indigenous fighter aircraft. As such no further production was carried out. No data except armament, construction and engine have survived.

Operators

Republic of China Air Force

Specifications (Chu XP-0)

See also

References

 
 

1940s Chinese fighter aircraft
World War II Chinese fighter aircraft